Bartal Eliasen (born 23 August 1976) is a Faroese international footballer who plays professionally as a defender for ÍF Fuglafjørður. Eliasen started his career in ÍF Fuglafjørður and has also played for GÍ Gøta. He has been capped for the Faroe Islands at senior level.

International career
Eliasen has played a total of 6 matches for the Faroe Islands from 1997 to 2009.

Individual Honours
Effodeildin Team of the Season: 2012

References

External links

Profile at faroesoccer.com

1976 births
Living people
People from Fuglafjørður
Faroese footballers
Faroe Islands international footballers
ÍF Fuglafjørður players
GÍ Gøta players
Association football defenders
Faroe Islands youth international footballers